RPM was a Canadian magazine that published the best-performing singles of Canada from 1964 to 2000. During 1980, twenty-two singles reached number one. American rock band Styx achieved the first number-one single of the year, "Babe", while Beatle John Lennon became the last musician to peak at the summit during the year with "(Just Like) Starting Over". Nine of the twenty-one chart-topping acts peaked atop the listing for the first time this year: Rupert Holmes, The Sugarhill Gang, Pink Floyd, The B-52's, Gary Numan, Lipps Inc., Billy Joel, Genesis, and Christopher Cross. No Canadian musicians reached number one in 1980.

The longest-running number-one single of the year, as well as the best-performing single of year, was Pink Floyd's "Another Brick in the Wall (Part 2)", which spent six issues at number one from 22 March to 26 April. "Call Me" by Blondie also remained atop the listing for six weeks, and Queen stayed a total of six weeks at the top with "Crazy Little Thing Called Love" and "Another One Bites the Dust". The Rolling Stones achieved a five-week stint at number one with "Emotional Rescue", and the two musical acts that remained at number one for three weeks were Kenny Rogers and Billy Joel.

Chart history

Notes

See also
1980 in music

Hot 100 number-one hits of 1980 (United States) by Billboard magazine
Cashbox Top 100 number-one singles of 1980 by Cash Box

References

External links
 Read about RPM Magazine at the AV Trust
 Search RPM charts here at Library and Archives Canada

 
1980 record charts
1980